Cheng Siwei (June 1935 – 12 July 2015) was a Chinese economist, chemical engineer and politician. He was the Chairman of China Soft Science Research Association; President of the Chinese Society for Management Modernization; Director of the Research Center on Fictitious Economy and Data Science, Chinese Academy of Sciences; Dean of the School of Management of the Graduate University of the Chinese Academy of Sciences and Honorary President of East China University of Science and Technology. 

He was also an Adjunct Professor and Doctoral Supervisor of institutions including the Chinese Academy of Sciences, Chinese Academy of Social Sciences, Guanghua School of Management of Peking University, and Nankai University.

Early life and education
Cheng Siwei was born June 1935, in Xiangxiang, Hunan Province, China. He attended Heung To Middle School in Hong Kong from 1948–1951; he then moved to Mainland China. During 1951–1952 he attended the Workers' College of Guangzhou South University, China. He then attended the South China Institute of Technology and East China Institute of Chemical Technology from 1952–1956, majoring in inorganic chemical technology, and in 1958–1973 he worked in various units of both the Ministry of Chemical Industry and the Ministry of Petroleum and Chemical Industries.

Career

He was the Chief Engineer of the Science & Technology Bureau of the Ministry of Chemical Industry (China) in 1973–1981. In 1981 he attended the University of California, Los Angeles, and graduated in 1984 with a Master of Business Administration (MBA). He then returned to his former position as Chief Engineer of the Science & Technology Bureau of the Ministry of Chemical Industry until 1988, when he was promoted to the Vice-President and Chief Engineer of the Scientific and Technical Research Institute of the Ministry of Chemical Industry. He became the Deputy Chief Engineer of the Ministry of Chemical Industry in 1993 and Vice-Minister of Chemical Industry in 1994–1997. During the same period, he held the position of the Chairman of the China Democratic National Construction Association (CDNCA) Central Committee, from 1996-1997. He continued to hold dual positions for nearly ten years, as the Chairman of the 7th and 8th Central Committees of the Chairman of the China Democratic National Construction Association (CDNCA) from 1997–2007, and as the Vice-Chairman of the Standing Committee of the Ninth and Tenth National People’s Congresses  in 1998–2008. During this time, he was also awarded an Honorary Doctor of Business Administration from Hong Kong Polytechnic University.

Academics

His research mainly covers complexity science, fictitious economy, venture capital, chemical systems engineering, soft science and management science. 

He has published several books, including Chromic Salts Technology, Rejuvenating Chemical Industry through Science and Technology, Soft Science and Reform, Large Linear Target Programming and Application, Research in China's Economic Development and Reform and Economic Reform and Development in China. In 2010, he began having his works translated into English and published through Enrich Professional Publishing  in Hong Kong, for a worldwide readership. The books Selected Works of Cheng Siwei, Economic Reforms and Development in China: Three-Volume Set are some of his most recent works. He has nearly 300 publications under his name at home and abroad. 

In recent years, he has devoted himself to the use of complexity science to study issues relating to the development and reform of China, made enormous efforts to explore and explain the characteristics and law of development of the fictitious economy, and actively studied and promoted the development of venture capital in China. The Brookings Institution has hosted him as a speaker in an effort to find out more about China's 12th 5-year-plan, including its top-level policy objectives.

Death
Cheng Siwei died in Beijing on the morning of 12 July 2015 at the age of 80.

Published works
Chromic Salts Technology
Rejuvenating Chemical Industry through Science and Technology
Soft Science and Reform
Large Linear Target Programming and Application Reform
The U.S. Financial Crisis: Analysis and Interpretation. San Francisco: Long River Press, 2012. 
Selected Works of Cheng Siwei, Economic Reforms and Development in China: Three-Volume Set

References

1935 births
2015 deaths
People's Republic of China economists
People's Republic of China politicians from Hunan
Vice Chairpersons of the National People's Congress
Members of the China National Democratic Construction Association
UCLA Anderson School of Management alumni
South China University of Technology alumni
East China University of Science and Technology alumni
Politicians from Xiangtan
Educators from Hunan
Economists from Hunan
Chinese chemical engineers
Chemists from Hunan
Engineers from Hunan